The 1952 Hardin–Simmons Cowboys football team was an American football team that represented Hardin–Simmons University in the Border Conference during the 1952 college football season. In its first season under head coach Murray Evans, the team compiled a 5–3–2 record (2–2–1 against conference opponents), finished in fourth place in the conference, and outscored opponents by a total of 221 to 189.

Six Hardin-Simmons players were named to the 1952 All-Border Conference football team: end D.C. Andrews; center Roy Carter; guard Bill Golman; fullback Mitchel Malouf; guard Bill Murry; and Maurice Waguespack.

Schedule

References

Hardin-Simmons
Hardin–Simmons Cowboys football seasons
Hardin-Simmons Cowboys football